Brzeźniak may refer to the following places:
Brzeźniak, Greater Poland Voivodeship (west-central Poland)
Brzeźniak, West Pomeranian Voivodeship (north-west Poland)
Brzeźniak, Wałcz County in West Pomeranian Voivodeship (north-west Poland)